The most significant and a landmark development in the cultural life of Assam was the establishment of the Baan Stage (old) or Baan theatre, the first modern Assamese theatre hall at Tezpur in 1906. The Baan Stage gave a platform for development of the Socio-Cultural scene of Assam. The great cultural trio Rupkonwar Jyoti Prasad Agarwala, Kalaguru Bishnu Prasad Rabha and Nata Surya Phani Sarma blossomed here. Phani Sarma along with Bishnu Rabha directed the most successful Assamese movie Siraj.

The Baan Stage (old) was constructed on the same plot of land donated to the Oxomiya Bhaxa Unnati Xadhini Xobha and with the donation from the public. Jyoti Prasad wrote several successful dramas which were played in the Ban Stage. Padmanath Gohain Baruah, Dandinath Kalita, Phani Sarma also wrote a number of successful plays for staging them in the Baan Stage. The tradition of staging dramas at the Baan Stage continuous till today.

History

Baan Theatre, an institution of excellence in performing arts and cultural, dates back to 1906. The Baan Theater has a glorious and long history. Before going into it we have to go back few years for the circumstances that lead to its birth. It is an accepted fact that the modern drama movement in Assam was started just after first freedom struggle i.e. in 1857 (popularly known as Sepoi Mutiny). The play by Historian Late Gunabhiram Baruah's "Ram Nabami Nat", which was first published as serial in ‘Arunodai’ from 1857 and published as book later in 1867 is the considered as the first step of this movement. Up to 1906, the establishment year of Baan Theatre, different writer wrote at least 25 Dramas and these were performed in their respective places. 
At Tezpur, this drama movement was closely associated with the famous "Asomiya Bhashar Unnati Sadhini Sabha" Tezpur Branch estd. 1890 and "Tezpur Armature Theater Party" estd. 1895. "Tezpur Armature Theater Party" had both Assamese and Bengali members, however due to an incident in 1903 Assamese Members get away from that organization, and decided to form a theater party under "Asomiya Bhashar Unnati Sadhini Sabha", which was later known as "Baan Theatre". "Baan Theatre" was situated at Kolibari up to 1958. A devastating storm in 1953 and the availability of land in centralized location of the town led general body to decide shifting the premise to the present location in 1955 and constructed up to a usable level in 1958.

Throughout its thick and thin, since its establishment more than 100 years ago, Baan Theatre has relentlessly pursued the policy of upgrading new and traditional creative art forms, broadening audience involvement and access and improving the livelihood of artists and opportunity to contribute to civic life.
Ban Theatre is proud of producing most talented people like ‘Rupkowar’ Jyotiprasad Agarwala, the doyen of Assamese art & culture, The pioneer in producing, directing, scoring music in the first Assamese film ever made viz. Jaimati, depicting the values and sacrifice of a woman revolting against a tyrannical ruler; ‘Kalaguru’ Bishnuprasad Rava, a revolutionary poet, lyricist, dancer, music composer and artist etc.; ‘Natasurya’ Phani Sharma, the play writer and famous actor in stage and screen; Dada Saheb Phalke Award Winner, "Roving Minstrel" Dr. Bhupen Hazarika, the internationally known music maestro, producer, director, music scorer in number of award-winning films; ‘Mancha-Kowar’ Chandradhar Goswami etc. to name few.

In the entire N. E. Region of the country, Baan Theatre, named after King Baan, the legendary ruler of Tezpur, occupies a unique position. In this long period of more than 100 years, it has strengthened the bond of unity among the people of different cast and creed. Baan Theatre is striving to achieve its objective of increasing opportunities for cultural and artistic expression for people of all backgrounds.

With new ideas, new technique it has brought laurels through its theatrical performances at the State and National level. The Natasurya Drama Festival, in the memory of Late Phani Sharma, is being regularly held every year since 1971 from 31 July to 4 August. The sole objective of this festival is to produce new dramas and new artist. It has already stage more than 100 dramas.
With donation and contribution from various public sector undertakings, voluntary organisations and individuals a huge theatre hall with a seating capacity of 900 persons has already been completed. The acoustic treatment of interior decoration of the auditorium with most modern folding cushioned chair was done at a huge cost. But so far stage and modern lighting equipment, musical instruments are concerned- much is yet to be done.

References

External links
Official website

Culture of Assam
Tezpur
1906 establishments in India
Arts organizations established in 1906